The 1969–70 season was the 97th season of competitive football in Scotland and the 73rd season of Scottish league football.

Scottish League Division One

Champions: Celtic 
Relegated: Raith Rovers, Partick Thistle

Scottish League Division Two

Promoted: Falkirk, Cowdenbeath

Cups

Other honours

National

County

 – aggregate over two legs – play off

Highland League

Individual awards

National team

1970 FIFA World Cup

Qualification

Group 7

Key:
(H) = Home match
(A) = Away match
WCQG7 = World Cup qualifying – Group 7
BHC = British Home Championship

Notes and references

External links
Scottish Football Historical Archive

 
Seasons in Scottish football